Robert Bennett Milgate (3 January 1925 – 11 January 1998) was an Australian rules footballer who played with Hawthorn in the Victorian Football League (VFL).

Milgate played with Camberwell from 1949 to 1952, winning the club goalkicking award in 1949 (63 goals), 1950 (35) and 1951 (69) and just 4 goals in 1952.

Prior to his football career, Milgate served in the Australian Army during World War II.

Notes

External links 

Bob Milgate's playing statistics from The VFA Project

1925 births
1998 deaths
Australian rules footballers from Melbourne
Hawthorn Football Club players
Camberwell Football Club players
People from Hawthorn, Victoria
Australian Army personnel of World War II
Military personnel from Melbourne